Vogesella indigofera is a strictly aerobic, Gram-negative bacterium. V. indigofera produces a blue pigment (indigoidine)and the colonies develop a metallic copper sheen upon extended incubation (greater than 24 hours). This organism is not known to be pathogenic and is commonly found in freshwater.

External links
Type strain of Vogesella indigofera at BacDive -  the Bacterial Diversity Metadatabase

Neisseriales